The Bechuanaland Protectorate was a protectorate established on 31 March 1885, by the United Kingdom of Great Britain and Ireland (later the United Kingdom of Great Britain and Northern Ireland) in Southern Africa. It became the Republic of Botswana on 30 September 1966.

History

Scottish missionary John Mackenzie (1835–1899), a Congregationalist of the London Missionary Society (LMS),  who lived at Shoshong from 1862–1876, "believed that the BamaNgwato and other African peoples with whom he worked were threatened by Boer freebooters encroaching on their territory from the south". He campaigned for the establishment of what became the Bechuanaland Protectorate, to be ruled directly from Britain.

Austral Africa: Losing It or Ruling It is Mackenzie's account of events leading to the establishment of the protectorate. Influenced by Mackenzie, in January 1885 the British cabinet decided to send a military expedition to South Africa to assert British sovereignty over the contested territory. Sir Charles Warren (1840–1927) led a force of 4,000 imperial troops north from Cape Town. After making treaties with several African chiefs, Warren announced the establishment of the protectorate in March 1885. In September that year the Tswana country south of the Molopo River was proclaimed the Crown colony of British Bechuanaland. Mackenzie accompanied Warren, and Austral Africa contains a detailed account of the expedition. 

Bechuanaland meant the "country of the Tswana" (from an archaic form of Batswana plus -land) and for administrative purposes was divided into two political entities. The northern part was administered as the Bechuanaland Protectorate and the southern part was administered as the crown colony of British Bechuanaland. British Bechuanaland was incorporated into the Cape Colony in 1895 and now forms part of South Africa.

It comprised an area occupied by the three main Tswana peoples: the Bamangwato, the Bakwena and the Bangwaketse, together with a number of minor tribes like the Bamalete and the Bakhatla. Also living in the Protectorate were the descendants of the original inhabitants of the area, such as Bushmen and Makalaka, who had been dispossessed by the Tswana peoples in the course of their migration south.

The British government originally expected to turn over the administration of the protectorate to Rhodesia or South Africa, but Tswana opposition left the protectorate under British rule until its independence in 1966.

The Bechuanaland Protectorate was technically a protectorate rather than a colony. Originally the local Tswana rulers were left in power, and British administration was limited to the police force to protect Bechuanaland's borders against other European colonial ventures. But on 9 May 1891 the British Government gave the administration of the protectorate to the High Commissioner for South Africa, who started to appoint officials in Bechuanaland, and the de facto independence of Bechuanaland ended.

The protectorate was administered from Mafeking, creating an unusual situation, the capital of the territory being located outside of the territory. The area of Mafeking (from 1980 with the incorporation into Bophuthatswana Mafikeng, since 2010 Mahikeng), was called 'The Imperial Reserve'. In 1885, when the protectorate was declared, Bechuanaland was bounded to the north by the latitude of 22° south. The northern boundary of the protectorate was formally extended northward by the British to include Ngamiland, which was then dominated by the Tawana state, on 30 June 1890. This claim was formally recognised by Germany the following day by Article III of the Heligoland-Zanzibar Treaty, which confirmed the western boundary of the British protectorate of Bechuanaland and the German protectorate of South-West Africa and also created the Caprivi strip inherited by modern Namibia:

 
In Southwest Africa, Germany's sphere of influence is demarcated thus:

 To the south by the line that commences at the mouth of the Orange River and continues up its northern bank to its intersection point with the 20° east longitude.
 To the east by the line that commences at the aforementioned point and follows the 20th degree of east longitude to its intersection point with the 22° south latitude. The line then traces this degree of latitude eastward to its intersection with the 21° east longitude, follows this degree of longitude northward to its intersection with the 18° south latitude, runs along this degree of latitude eastward to its intersection with the Chobe River. Here it descends the thalweg of the main channel until it meets the Zambezi, where it ends. It is understood that under this arrangement Germany shall be granted free access from its protectorate to the Zambezi by means of a strip of land not less than twenty English miles wide at any point. Great Britain's sphere of influence is bounded to the west and northwest by the previously described line and includes Lake Ngami.

British officials did not arrive in the Ngamiland region until 1894.

The Tati Concessions Land Act of 21 January 1911 transferred the new eastern territory to the protectorate:
From the place where the Shashe River rises to its junction with the Tati and Ramokgwebana Rivers, thence along the Ramokgwebana River to where it rises and thence along the watershed of those rivers,
This territory was originally claimed by Matabeleland. In 1887 Samuel Edwards, working for Cecil Rhodes, obtained a mining concession, and in 1895 the British South Africa Company attempted to acquire the area, but the Tswana chiefs Bathoen I, Khama III and Sebele I visited London to protest and were successful in fending off the BSAC. This territory forms the modern North-East District of Botswana.

Politics
The proclamation of a protectorate flanked by a new Crown colony to the south (British Bechuanaland) were primarily intended as safeguards against further expansion by Germany, Portugal, or Boers.

Contrary to what was reported at the time by Warren and others, not all chiefs affected by the protectorate were in favour of it. The most powerful ruler was King Khama III, who had strong support from the British government, and was especially popular among evangelicals in Britain. He collaborated closely with the British military, and kept his vast, but underpopulated lands independent from intruders from South Africa.

Khama's eldest son, Sekgoma II, became chief of the Bamangwato upon Khama's death in 1923. Sekgoma II's eldest son was named Seretse. Throughout his life Khama was widowed and remarried several times. One wife, Semane, birthed a son named Tshekedi.

Sekgoma II's reign lasted only a year or so, leaving his son Seretse, who at the time was an infant, as the rightful heir to the chieftainship (Tshekedi was not in line to be chief since he did not descend from Khama's oldest son Sekgoma II). So in keeping with tradition, Tshekedi acted as regent of the tribe until Seretse was old enough to assume the chieftainship. The transfer of responsibility from Tshekedi to Seretse was planned to occur after Seretse had returned from his law studies overseas in Britain.

Tshekedi's regency as acting chief of the Bamangwato is best remembered for his expansion of the mephato (regiments) to build primary schools, grain silos, and water reticulation systems, for his frequent confrontations with the British colonial authorities over the administration of justice in Ngwato country, and for his efforts to deal with a major split in the tribe after Seretse married a white woman, Ruth Williams, while studying law in Britain.

Tshekedi opposed the marriage on the grounds that under Tswana custom a chief could not marry simply as he pleased. He was a servant of the people; the chieftaincy itself was at stake. Seretse would not budge in his desire to marry Ruth, and he did, while exiled in Britain in 1948. Tribal opinion about the marriage basically split evenly along demographic lines – older people went with Tshekedi, the younger with Seretse. In the end, British authorities exiled both men (Tshekedi from the Bamangwato territory, Seretse from the Protectorate altogether). Rioting broke out and a number of people were killed.

Seretse and Ruth were allowed to return to the Protectorate and Seretse and Tshekedi were able to patch things up a bit between themselves. By now though, Seretse saw his destiny not as chief of the Bamangwato tribe, but rather as leader of the Botswana Democratic Party and as President of the soon-to-be independent nation of Botswana in 1966. He would remain Botswana's President until his death from pancreatic cancer in 1980. The story of Seretse and Ruth forms the basis of the 2016 film A United Kingdom.

Commissioners

The Bechuanaland Protectorate was one of the "High Commission Territories", the others being Basutoland (now Lesotho) and Swaziland (now Eswatini. The High Commissioner had some of the functions of a governor, but the major tribes were self-governing, and the protectorate was not a British possession, so was not available for white settlement. The office was first held by the governor of the Cape Colony, then by the Governor-General of South Africa, then by the High Commissioner for Southern Africa until independence. In each of the three territories, the administration of Britain’s responsibilities was headed by a Resident Commissioner with some of the functions of a Governor but less authority.

Justice
The Chief Justice was the Chief Justice of the High Commission Territories (Basutoland, Bechuanaland Protectorate and Swaziland). From 1951 the Chief Justices were:

Postage stamps 

Bechuanaland postage stamps were issued from 1888 to 1966. Overprinted stamps were issued until 1932, when the first stamps inscribed "Bechuanaland Protectorate" were issued. On 14 February 1961 the South African rand was introduced, necessitating the surcharging of the existing definitive stamps until new ones were issued.

Gallery of postage stamps

Revenue stamps for British Bechuanaland

See also
History of Botswana
British Bechuanaland, the area south of the Molopo River, now part of South Africa.

Notes

Further reading 
 
 Harrigan, Walter et al. Report of the judicial enquiry Re Seretse Khama of the Bamangwato tribe (1 December 1949), reproduced in Botswana Notes and Records, Vol 17 (1985), pp 53–64.
 
 
 Parsons, Neil. New History of Southern Africa
  Thesis presented for the degree of Master of Arts, University of Cape Town

External links 

Bechuana Canteen Token Coin
History of Botswana
List of Bechuanaland Colonial Administrators
Bibliography for Botswana History
https://www.britannica.com/place/Botswana/British-protectorate

 
Former British colonies and protectorates in Africa
Former colonies in Africa
History of South Africa
States and territories established in 1885
States and territories disestablished in 1966

1885 establishments in Africa
1966 disestablishments in Africa
1885 establishments in the British Empire
1966 disestablishments in the British Empire
19th-century establishments in Bechuanaland Protectorate
19th century in South Africa
20th century in South Africa
20th century in Botswana